Herman "Flying Dutchman" Willemse (22 May 1934 – 7 July 2021) was a Dutch long-distance and marathon swimmer. In 2008, he was inducted to the International Marathon Swimming Hall of Fame.

Willemse started his career as a freestyle swimmer, winning 13 national titles and setting 19 national records in the 100 m, 200 m, 400 m, 800 m and 1500 m events between 1952 and 1958. In 1959, he switched to marathon swimming and became the second Dutchman to cross the English Channel, with a time of 12h49. Later in the 1960s he dominated the world marathon swimming. For three years after 1964, when the point system was introduced, he was ranked world number two, after Abo Heif. His clean sweep of the Around-the-Island Marathon Swim in 1960–1964 brought the organizers to a problem that spectators lost interest in the race. The race was discontinued in 1965.

A school teacher by profession, Willemse was known for his academic approach to swimming. He would often travel around the place before the competition and measure the water temperature, to optimize his racing strategy, or even withdraw from a potentially disastrous race if the temperature was too low. He retired from competitive swimming around 1970 and published a book titled Marathonzwemmen (Marathon Swimming).

International competitions
St. John Lake Swim (1961, Canada, 30 km) – 1st place, 10h 7min
St. John Lake Swim (1962, Canada, 30 km) – 1st place, 9h 3min
St. John Lake Swim (1963, Canada, 30 km) – 1st place, 8h 32min
Around-the-Island Marathon Swim (1960, Atlantic City, USA, 36 km) – 1st place, 10h 30min
Around-the-Island Marathon Swim (1961, Atlantic City, USA, 36 km) – 1st place, 11h 14min
Around-the-Island Marathon Swim (1962, Atlantic City, USA, 36 km) – 1st place, 11h 35min
Around-the-Island Marathon Swim (1963, Atlantic City, USA, 36 km) – 1st place, 10h 31min
Around-the-Island Marathon Swim (1964, Atlantic City, USA, 36 km) – 1st place, 10h 08min
National Exhibition race (1961, Canada, 24 km) – 1st place, 6h 54min
National Exhibition race (1962, Canada, 24 km) – 1st place, 6h 38min
la Descente ou remontée du Saguenay (1966, 37 km) – 1st place, 6h 15min
Tois Riviere (1961–1963 and 1965, Canada, 16 km) – 1st place (4 times)
Santa Fe-Coronda (1963, Argentina, 58 km) – 1st place
Santa Fe-Coronda (1964, Argentina, 58 km) – 3rd place
Santa Fe-Coronda (1966, Argentina, 58 km) – 3rd place
Hernandaras-Parana (Argentina, 88 km) – 1st place

See also
 List of members of the International Swimming Hall of Fame

References

Bibliography

1934 births
2021 deaths
Dutch male freestyle swimmers
Dutch male long-distance swimmers
English Channel swimmers
Sportspeople from Utrecht (city)
20th-century Dutch people